George Fullard  (15 September 1923 – 25 December 1973) was an English sculptor.

Born in Sheffield on 15 September 1923 Fullard served with the 17th/21st Lancers during World War II and was severely wounded at the Battle of Cassino. He studied at the Sheffield College of Arts and Crafts, and the Royal College of Art. By 1958 John Berger, the art critic of the New Statesman, regarded him as Britain's best young contemporary sculptor. He began to exhibit abroad and win prizes: for example, "Running Woman", which can be seen in the grounds of Upper Chapel in Sheffield city centre.

A painting by Fullard won a minor John Moores in 1957.

He died on 25 December 1973.

Notes

1923 births
1973 deaths
17th/21st Lancers soldiers
Alumni of the Royal College of Art
English sculptors
English male sculptors
Artists from Sheffield
20th-century British sculptors
Geometry of Fear
Associates of the Royal Academy